The Secret Vampire Soundtrack is the EP that launched Bis into the public eye with the song "Kandy Pop". It was released in 4 formats, 7 inch and 12 inch vinyl records, cassette tape and compact disc.

Track listing
All tracks written by Bis.

"Kandy Pop" (2:47)
"Secret Vampires" (2:36)
"Teen-C Power" (2:41)
"Diska" (3:02)

Personnel
Recorded by - Richie Dempsey and Paul Savage

Charts

References

Bis (Scottish band) EPs
1995 EPs
Chemikal Underground EPs